Vicki Strong (born February 15, 1957) is an American politician who has served in the Vermont House of Representatives from the Orleans-Caledonia 1 district since 2011.

References

1957 births
Living people
21st-century American politicians
21st-century American women politicians
Women state legislators in Vermont
Republican Party members of the Vermont House of Representatives